Prices Corner is an unincorporated community in New Castle County, Delaware, United States. Prices Corner is located at the intersection of Delaware Route 2 and Delaware Route 141, west of Wilmington. The Prices Corner Shopping Center is located in Prices Corner.

References

External links

Unincorporated communities in New Castle County, Delaware
Unincorporated communities in Delaware